Dorje Rabten (born February 1956) is a Chinese politician of Tibetan ethnicity who served as chairman of the Qinghai Provincial Committee of the Chinese People's Political Consultative Conference from 2018 to 2022.

He was a member of the 18th CCP Central Commission for Discipline Inspection. He was a member of the 11th and 13th National Committee of the Chinese People's Political Consultative Conference.

Biography
Dorje Rabten was born in Jainca County, Qinghai, in February 1956. In August 1972, he was accepted to Huangyuan Animal Husbandry School (now Qinghai Animal Husbandry and Veterinary Vocational and Technical College), majoring in veterinary medicine. 

Dorje Rabten joined the Chinese Communist Party in July 1976. After graduation in August 1977, he was assigned to the Qinghai Animal Husbandry and Veterinary General Station. In April 1981, he was despatched to the Qinghai Provincial Department of Animal Husbandry, where he worked for six years. In January 1986, he became party secretary of Qinghai Department Store, and soon served as manager and party secretary of Qinghai Ethnic Trade Company. In March 1990, he rose to become deputy governor of Yushu Tibetan Autonomous Prefecture. He served as governor of Huangnan Tibetan Autonomous Prefecture from March 1996 to June 1997, and party secretary, the top political position in the prefecture, from June 1997 to November 2002. He was party secretary of Hainan Tibetan Autonomous Prefecture in November 2002, and held that office until May 2007. He was appointed head of the United Front Work Department of CCP Qinghai Provincial Committee in May 2007, concurrently holding the secretary of Qinghai Commission for Discipline Inspection position since February 2013. In January 2018, he was proposed as chairman of the Qinghai Provincial Committee of the Chinese People's Political Consultative Conference, the province's top political advisory body.

References

1956 births
Living people
People from Jainca County
Tibetan politicians
Central Party School of the Chinese Communist Party alumni
People's Republic of China politicians from Qinghai
Chinese Communist Party politicians from Qinghai
Governors of Huangnan Tibetan Autonomous Prefecture
Members of the 11th Chinese People's Political Consultative Conference
Members of the 13th Chinese People's Political Consultative Conference